Atosioides accola is a species of moth of the family Limacodidae. It is found in western Sumatra and southern Thailand on altitudes between 130 and 1,000 meters.

The wingspan is about 17 mm. The body is yellowish brown. The forewings have dark oblique medial fascia followed by a pale area. The hindwings are paler than the forewings. Adults have been recorded in mid September and early December.

Etymology
The species name is derived from Latin accola  (meaning neighbour) because of the distribution of both Atosioides species, that both occur on Sumatra.

References

Limacodidae
Moths described in 2009
Moths of Asia